Guil Station is a subway station in Seoul, South Korea, that serves Seoul Subway Line 1. The name of this station comes from its location within Guro 1 (pronounced il)-dong. Dongyang Mirae University is located nearby.

Vicinity
Exit 1 : Guil Elementary, Middle, and High Schools
Exit 2 (under construction): Guro Sungsim Hospital, Dongyang Mirae University, Guro Fire Station

Near Subway Station
 Anyang stream
 Lotte Mart

References

Seoul Metropolitan Subway stations
Metro stations in Guro District, Seoul
Railway stations opened in 1995